When Men Discuss Women is a 1967 Argentine film directed by Fernando Ayala.

External links
 

1967 films
Argentine comedy films
1960s Spanish-language films
Films directed by Fernando Ayala
1960s Argentine films